Diana C. Zollicoffer (born 1977), is a Seychellois filmmaker and actress particularly active in Indie film industry. She is best known as the producer of critically acclaimed productions such as Schmoolie the Deathwatcher, Bridget and Iain and Forgotten Bayou.

Career
She has graduated from Duke Ellington School of the Arts, Washington DC.

Filmography

References

External links
 
 Latest News on Diana Zollicoffer
 "Innocent Flesh" Preview Performance

Living people
1977 births
Sotho people
South African actresses